Ravensborg, formerly called Norstead, is the name of a replica Viking Age fort in northern Missouri which began construction in the spring of 2007.

Ravensborg is a type of ringfort -- a circular earthen rampart and wood palisade with several buildings within. 

While not permanently inhabited, the site is used to recreate a Viking Age fortification allowing living history enthusiasts to experience Medieval life in a longhouse for short periods. This is a form of experimental archeology and is expected to shed new light on how ordinary folk lived and functioned in such an environment. The fort contrasts with the temporary tent encampments typically experienced by reenactors.

Various Viking reenactment groups gather here for twice-yearly celebrations in April and October.  Participants are required to wear period clothing, participate in traditional crafts, eat historical foods, and essentially live an early Medieval lifestyle.  Those trained in live-steel combat techniques may participate in such activities here as well.

The site currently consists of a longhouse, a cookhouse, a forge shelter, gate house, and personal cottages regular visitors have constructed for use by their families and guests. 

The site was renamed "Ravensborg" in 2009.

Ext. Link and Refs.

 TV interview with principles
 Video of the facility from 2015

Viking reenactment
Experimental archaeology